Afif Jebali (born 10 January 2000) is a Tunisian football defender who currently plays for Al-Mina'a which competes in the Iraqi Premier League.

Honours 
ES Tunis
 Tunisian Ligue I: 2019
 CAF Champions League: 2019

References

External links 
 
 
 
 

2000 births
Living people
Tunisian footballers
Espérance Sportive de Tunis players
CS Hammam-Lif players
ES Métlaoui players
Al-Mina'a SC players
Association football defenders
Tunisian Ligue Professionnelle 1 players
Tunisian expatriate footballers
Expatriate footballers in Iraq
Tunisian expatriate sportspeople in Iraq